The team eventing competition was one of six equestrian events on the Equestrian at the 1988 Summer Olympics programme. Dressage and stadium jumping portions of the competition were held at the Seoul Equestrian Park in Seoul, the endurance stage was held at Wondang Ranch in Goyang.

The competition was split into three phases:

Dressage (22–23 September)
Riders performed the dressage test.
Endurance (24 September)
Riders tackled roads and tracks, steeplechase and cross-country portions.
Jumping (25 September)
Riders jumped at the show jumping course.

Scores from the top 3 finishing horse and rider pairs for each nation were summed to give a team score. Nations with fewer than 3 pairs finishing were not given a final score.

Results

References

Team eventing